Periódico  26 is a Cuban newspaper. It is published in Spanish, with an online English edition. The newspaper is located in Las Tunas Province.

References

External links
 Periódico 26 online 
 Periódico 26 online 

Newspapers published in Cuba
Publications with year of establishment missing
Spanish-language newspapers